Boris Savić (Serbian Cyrillic: Борис Савић born 18 January 1988) is a Bosnian professional football manager and former player.

Playing career
Born in Trebinje, SR Bosnia and Herzegovina, Savić started his career in Serbia by playing with the youth teams of Red Star Belgrade. As a senior, he started playing in Serbian lower-league sides Tavankut, Palić, Sinđelić Beograd and Hajduk Beograd. After a short spell in Bosnia and Herzegovina with Laktaši, he was back to Serbia this time by signing with Rad, after trials in Germany with TSV 1860 Munich. Next, Savić was back in Bosnia playing with Olimpik, Borac Banja Luka (with whom he won the Republika Srpska Cup in the 2011–12 cup season) and Rudar Prijedor. He then had a spell at Mornar in the Montenegrin First League as well.

One of three European additions to Moroka Swallows in 2014, Savić missed the club's first two matches owing to work permit delays. After being cleared to play, he was sidelined for six weeks due to getting an injury and had to unpremeditatedly undergo an operation. In the end, Savić left Moroka Swallows as his mother was ill and asked the club if he could return to his home country.

Shortly after leaving Moroka, Savić decided to finish his playing career.

Managerial career
One year after finishing his playing career, Savić got an UEFA Pro Licence as a manager. He started as manager of Bosnian club Jedinstvo Žeravica, and in the summer of 2017 he moved to Cyprus where he became an assistant manager of Vladan Milojević at Alki Oroklini. In May 2018, he came back to Jedinstvo Žeravica. In the 2018–19 season, Savić won the Second League of RS - west division, and got the club promoted to the First League of RS. On 4 July 2019 however, Jedinstvo decided not to participate in the 2019–20 First League of RS season because of financial reasons.

On 27 May 2019, shortly after winning the league with Jedinstvo, he left the club and became the new manager of, at the time, Bosnian Premier League club Zvijezda 09. In his first league game as Zvijezda's manager, the club lost 1–5 at home against Tuzla City on 20 July 2019. On 31 August 2019, Savić decided to leave Zvijezda 09 after a poor start to the 2019–20 season.

On 10 January 2020, he was named manager of Serbian club IMT, who he later on promoted to the Serbian First League. After leaving IMT, on 21 May 2020, Savić replaced Igor Janković as manager of First League of RS club Rudar Prijedor. He decided to leave Rudar on 18 April 2021.

Honours

Player
Borac Banja Luka 
Republika Srpska Cup: 2011–12

Manager
Jedinstvo Žeravica
Second League of RS: 2018–19 (West)

IMT
Serbian League Belgrade: 2019–20

References

External links
Boris Savić at Whoscored

1988 births
Living people
People from Trebinje
Association football central defenders
Bosnia and Herzegovina footballers
FK Palić players
FK Sinđelić Beograd players
FK Hajduk Beograd players
FK Laktaši players
FK Rad players
FK Olimpik players
FK Borac Banja Luka players
FK Rudar Prijedor players
FK Mornar players
Moroka Swallows F.C. players
Serbian First League players
Premier League of Bosnia and Herzegovina players
South African Premier Division players
Bosnia and Herzegovina expatriate footballers
Expatriate footballers in Serbia
Bosnia and Herzegovina expatriate sportspeople in Serbia
Expatriate footballers in Montenegro
Bosnia and Herzegovina expatriate sportspeople in Montenegro
Expatriate soccer players in South Africa
Bosnia and Herzegovina football managers
FK Zvijezda 09 managers
FK Rudar Prijedor managers
FK Mačva Šabac managers
Premier League of Bosnia and Herzegovina managers
Bosnia and Herzegovina expatriate football managers
Expatriate football managers in Cyprus
Bosnia and Herzegovina expatriate sportspeople in Cyprus